Rho Leonis (ρ Leo) is a binary star in the zodiac constellation of Leo, and, like the prominent nearby star Regulus, is near the ecliptic. With an apparent visual magnitude of 3.9, this star can be readily seen with the naked eye. Rho Leonis is an Alpha Cygni-type variable star, showing 0.032 magnitude brightness variations with a period of 3.427 days, in Hipparcos data.

This is an enormous star with about 21 times the Sun's mass and 37 times the Sun's radius. Its spectrum matches a stellar classification of B1 Iab, with the 'Iab' luminosity class indicating that it is in the supergiant stage of its evolution. Rho Leonis is radiating about 45,000 times the Sun's luminosity at an effective temperature of 22,000 K, giving it the blue-white hue typical of a B-type star. The rotation rate is probably about once per 7 days, with an upper limit of 47 days.

Rho Leonis is classified as a runaway star, which means it has a peculiar velocity of at least 30 km s−1 relative to the surrounding stars.

Rho Leo is 0.15 degree north of the ecliptic, so it can be occulted by the moon. Unusual light variation during these occultations has been explained as the result of a possible close companion.  The companion would be just over one magnitude fainter and separated by 0.01 arcsec. The companion has not been detected by any other means although it should be easily detected with modern observations.

References

External links

Leonis, Rho
Leo (constellation)
B-type supergiants
Leonis, 47
051624
091316
4133
BD+10 2166
Binary stars
Alpha Cygni variables